Brachylaena huillensis is a species of flowering plant in the family Asteraceae. It is found in Angola, Kenya, Mozambique, South Africa, Tanzania, Uganda, and Zimbabwe.

The tree has a very hard wood, which makes it ideal for processing into charcoal.  In fact, the tree was Kenya's main source of fuel until the 1830s.  It is still a popular fuel source, and in some areas it is threatened by overexploitation.  This has led to concern from conservationists over habitat loss for endemic animal species living in Brachylaena cloud forests.

References

External links

huillensis
Flora of East Tropical Africa
Flora of South Tropical Africa
Flora of Southern Africa
Near threatened plants
Taxonomy articles created by Polbot